At least three ships and one ship class of the Imperial Russian Navy have been named Vyborg, after the successful siege of Vyborg in 1710.

  A class of four 50-gun ships built during the Great Northern War.
  50-gun ship that had to be destroyed after running aground in 1712
  54-gun  ship scrapped after 1739
  74-gun ship later converted to steam power; stricken in 1863

Russian Navy ship names